The Beryozovka is a river in Komi Republic and Perm Krai, Russia. It starts in Pechora-Ilych Nature Reserve in Komi Republic and flows into Lake Chusovskoye in the north of Cherdynsky District of Perm Krai.

References 

Rivers of Perm Krai